The 2012–13 UEFA Europa League group stage featured 48 teams: the 7 automatic qualifiers, the 31 winners of the play-off round, and the 10 losing teams from the Champions League play-off round.

The teams were drawn into twelve groups of four, and played each other home-and-away in a round-robin format. The top two teams in each group advanced to the round of 32, where they were joined by the eight third-placed teams from the Champions League group stage.

Seeding
The draw for the group stage was held on 31 August 2012, 13:00 CEST (UTC+2), at Grimaldi Forum, Monaco.

Teams were seeded into four pots based on their 2012 UEFA club coefficients. The title holders, Atlético Madrid, were automatically seeded into Pot 1.

Notes
th Title holder (automatically gets the top position of seeding list)
Q Qualifiers through play-off round
CL-CR Losing teams from the Champions League play-off round (Champions Route)
CL-LR Losing teams from the Champions League play-off round (League Route)

Each group contained one team from each of the four pots, with the restriction that teams from the same national association cannot be drawn against each other. Moreover, the draw was controlled for teams from the same association in order to split the teams evenly into the two sets of groups (A–F, G–L) for maximum television coverage.

The fixtures were decided after the draw. On each matchday, six groups played their matches at 19:00 CET/CEST, while the other six groups played their matches at 21:05 CET/CEST, with the two sets of groups (A–F, G–L) alternating between each matchday. There were other restrictions, e.g., teams from the same city in general did not play at home on the same matchday (UEFA tries to avoid teams from the same city playing at home on the same day or on consecutive days), and Russian teams did not play at home on the last matchday due to cold weather.

Tiebreakers
The teams are ranked according to points (3 points for a win, 1 point for a tie, 0 points for a loss). If two or more teams are equal on points on completion of the group matches, the following criteria are applied to determine the rankings:
higher number of points obtained in the group matches played among the teams in question;
superior goal difference from the group matches played among the teams in question;
higher number of goals scored in the group matches played among the teams in question;
higher number of goals scored away from home in the group matches played among the teams in question;
If, after applying criteria 1) to 4) to several teams, two teams still have an equal ranking, criteria 1) to 4) are reapplied exclusively to the matches between the two teams in question to determine their final rankings. If this procedure does not lead to a decision, criteria 6) to 8) apply;
superior goal difference from all group matches played;
higher number of goals scored from all group matches played;
higher number of coefficient points accumulated by the club in question, as well as its association, over the previous five seasons.

Groups
The matchdays were 20 September, 4 October, 25 October, 8 November, 22 November, and 6 December 2012.

Times up to 27 October 2012 (matchdays 1–3) are CEST (UTC+2), thereafter (matchdays 4–6) times are CET (UTC+1).

Group A

Notes
Note 1: Anzhi Makhachkala played their home matches at Lokomotiv Stadium, Moscow instead of their regular stadium, Dynamo Stadium, Makhachkala, due to security issues involving the city of Makhachkala and the autonomous republic of Dagestan.

Group B

Group C

Notes
Note 2: AEL Limassol played their home matches at GSP Stadium, Nicosia instead of their regular stadium, Tsirion Stadium, Limassol.

Group D

Group E

Tiebreakers
Stuttgart are ranked ahead of Copenhagen on head-to-head points.

Group F

Group G

Notes
Note 3: The Sporting CP v Videoton match, originally scheduled to take place on 6 December 2012, 21:05 CET, was postponed due to a waterlogged pitch. It was rescheduled to take place on 7 December 2012, 21:05 CET.

Group H

Tiebreakers
Partizan are ranked ahead of Neftçi on head-to-head away goals.

Notes
Note 4: Neftçi played their home matches at Tofiq Bahramov Stadium, Baku instead of their regular stadium, Ismat Gayibov Stadium, Baku.

Group I

Notes
Note 5: Ironi Kiryat Shmona played their home matches at Kiryat Eliezer Stadium, Haifa instead of their regular stadium, Municipal Stadium, Kiryat Shmona.
Note 6: The Ironi Kiryat Shmona v Athletic Bilbao match, originally scheduled to take place on 22 November 2012, 19:00 CET, was postponed by UEFA on 21 November due to the ongoing security situation in Israel. It was rescheduled to take place on 28 November 2012, 19:00 CET.

Group J

Group K

Tiebreakers
Metalist Kharkiv are ranked ahead of Bayer Leverkusen on head-to-head points.

Notes
Note 7: Rapid Wien played their home matches at Ernst-Happel-Stadion, Vienna instead of their regular stadium, Gerhard-Hanappi-Stadion, Vienna.
Note 8: The Rapid Wien v Rosenborg match was played behind closed doors due to the punishment handed to Rapid Wien by UEFA following incidents at their play-off round first leg against PAOK on 23 August 2012.

Group L

References

External links
2012–13 UEFA Europa League, UEFA.com

2
2012-13